Parectopa pulverella is a moth of the family Gracillariidae. It is known from the Dominican Republic and the Virgin Islands (Saint Thomas).

References

Gracillariinae